Somatochlora exuberata is a species of dragonfly in the family Corduliidae. It is found in eastern Russia, northern China, Korea, and Hokkaido, Japan.

References

Corduliidae
Odonata of Asia
Insects described in 1910